is an important English tort law, contract law and labour law, which concerns vicarious liability and an ostensible duty of an employee to compensate the employer for torts he commits in the course of employment.

Facts
Martin Lister and his father Martin Lister were working for the Cold Storage company, driving a waste disposal lorry. They went to a slaughterhouse on Old Church Road, Romford. When they were entering through the gates to the yard, the father got out ahead and the son, driving, backed over him. McNair J awarded the father two thirds of the compensation to reflect the father’s contributory negligence. The insurers, who paid £1600 and costs, sued the son in the name of the company (which was not consulted) by right of subrogation to indemnify them for this sum.

Judgment

Court of Appeal
The majority of the Court of Appeal ([1956] 2 QB 180), Birkett LJ and Romer LJ, held that the insurance company could seek contribution from the son, because the son had a contractual duty of care and skill and it was not permissible to imply a term that no indemnity could be sought.

Denning LJ dissented. After describing the facts he went on as follows.

House of Lords
The House of Lords held by a bare majority (Lord Radcliffe and Lord Somervell of Harrow dissenting) that contracts of employment contain an implied term that an employee owes a duty to take reasonable care of the employer's property and in the performance of his tasks. So the lorry, which was entrusted to him, was used carelessly when Martin ran over his father. This meant the son was responsible, and because no term could be implied that an employee may be indemnified by the employer or his insurance, the son would have to pay the insurance company back.

Lord Morton said the following on implied terms.

Lord Tucker, in the course of his judgment, set out the incidents of a "master-servant" relationship.

See also
Morris v Ford Motor Co Ltd [1973] 1 QB 792, Court of Appeal very close to refusing to follow Lister
Williams v Natural Life Health Foods Ltd, English case where Lord Steyn implicitly overrules Lister
Douglas v Kinger, 2008 ONCA 452, Canadian case doubting Lister
London Drugs Ltd v Kuehne & Nagel International Ltd, La Forest J, dissenting, disapproving Lister

Notes

References
Gerald Gardiner, 'Lister v. The Romford Ice and Cold Storage Company, Ltd.' (1959) 22(6) Modern Law Review 652-656

External links
Hansard 28 January 1957 and 18 April 1957, showing the government considering repeal after the decision

United Kingdom labour case law
English tort case law
House of Lords cases
1956 in British law
1956 in case law